The Pakistan national cricket team toured Australia in the 1992–93 season and took part in the Benson & Hedges World Series Cup but was eliminated in the qualifying stage.

Pakistan played one first-class match on the tour against Queensland at the Brisbane Cricket Ground.  Pakistan won by 5 wickets.

External sources
 CricketArchive

References
 Wisden Cricketers Almanack 

1992 in Australian cricket
1992 in Pakistani cricket
1992–93 Australian cricket season
1993 in Australian cricket
1993 in Pakistani cricket
International cricket competitions from 1991–92 to 1994
1992-93